Lekié is a department of Centre Province in Cameroon. The department covers an area of 2,989 km and  had a total population of 354,864. The capital of the department lies at Monatélé.

It is named after the Lekié River.

Subdivisions
The department is divided administratively into nine communes and in turn into villages.

Communes 
 Batchenga
 Ebebda
 Elig-Mfomo
 Evodoula
 Lobo
 Monatélé
 Obala
 Okola
 Sa'a

References

Departments of Cameroon
Centre Region (Cameroon)